P. V. Abdul Wahab (born 1 July 1950) is an Indian politician and social worker from Nilambur, Malappuram. He currently serves as a Member of Parliament from Kerala in the Rajya Sabha (the Council of States or the Upper House). He is also a non-resident Indian businessman with activities in India and the Middle East.

Wahab also serves as the Treasurer, Indian Union Muslim League and Leader, Indian Union Muslim League in Rajya Sabha. He has been elected as Member of Rajya Sabha from Kerala thrice (2004–10, 2015–21, and 2021 to the present). He is currently a member of the Parliamentary Committee on External Affairs.

Life and career
Wahab was born on 1 July 1950 to P. V. (Pulikkal Veettil) Alavikutty and Varikkodan Fathima at Nilambur in northern Kerala. He was educated at Government Manavedan High School, Nilambur and M. E. S College, Mampad.

He is married to Yasmine from 1976 and the couple has four sons. He was first elected to the Rajya Sabha in 2004.

Parliamentary committees 

 Committee on Social Justice and Empowerment (2004–2010)
 Committee on Rules (2015–2018)
 Committee on Chemicals and Fertilizers (2015–2019)
 Railway Convention Committee (2016–2019)
 Committee on External Affairs (2019–2021)
 Committee on Industry (2021–2022)

Consultative Committees 

 Consultative Committee for the Ministry of Civil Aviation (2004–2010)
 Consultative Committee for the Ministry of Human Resource Development (2015–2019)
 Consultative Committee for the Ministry of Minority Affairs (2019–2021)

Business portfolio 

 Head, Peevees and Bridgeway Group (in India, United Arab Emirates, Qatar and Saudi Arabia)
 Chairman, Indus Motors, Kerala
 Director, Malabar Institute of Medical Sciences
 Director,  Feroke Boards, Kozhikode
 Director, Cheraman Financial Services
 Centre Square Shopping Mall, Cochin
 Amal College of Advanced Studies, Nilambur

Social profile 

 Chairman, Peevees Charitable Trust
 Chairman, Keraleeyam (an NGO for HIV affected people)
 Chairman, Calicut Airport Development Committee, 1994–2004
 Chairman, Jan Sikshan Sansthan (an NGO sponsored by the Ministry of Human Resource Development)
Patron, Nilambur Orphanage
President, Peevees Schools
Member
Islamic Chair, Calicut University
Kerala State Haj Committee, Kozhikode. 
Kerala Waqf Board, Kochi.
Chairman, Malabar Airport Development Action Committee (MADAC)
Malabar Development Board
Malabar Chamber of Commerce
Rajiv Gandhi International Sports Foundation (former)

Recognitions 

 Confucius Prize for Literacy, UNESCO (2016) for Jan Sikshan Sansthan.
 Saakshar Bharat Award (2014) for Jan Sikshan Sansthan.

Wahab has 'adopted' Karulayi village near his municipality, Nilambur, under the Sansad Adarsh Gram Yojana (SAGY) project.

References

External links
 

Rajya Sabha members from Kerala
Malayali politicians
Living people
People from Malappuram district
Indian Union Muslim League politicians
1950 births